MySchoolHelp was a website for online collaboration between school students, created by Ben Lang. Lang was a 17-year-old high school student when he created the site.

A Forbes column on ethics in the classroom used MySchoolHelp as an example of a potentially problematic tool in the context of "the increasingly grey area of academic integrity". The Stuyvesant High School student newspaper, the Stuyvesant Spectator, raised similar questions.

References 

Internet properties established in 2011
American educational websites